Daniel "Dani" Cárdenas Lindez (born 28 March 1997) is a Spanish professional footballer who plays for Levante UD as a goalkeeper.

Club career
Born in Terrassa, Barcelona, Catalonia, Cárdenas joined Levante UD's youth academy in January 2014 after notably representing FC Barcelona and RCD Espanyol. He was promoted to the former's reserves for the 2016–17 season, and made his senior debut on 20 August 2016 by starting in a 0–1 Segunda División B home loss against CD Atlético Baleares.

Initially third choice behind Daniel Sotres and Koke Vegas, Cardenas became a regular starter after the former left and the latter was promoted to the main squad. On 12 March 2020, he renewed his contract until 2022.

On 27 November 2020, as Aitor was injured, Cárdenas made his first-team – and La Liga – debut, playing the full 90 minutes in a 1–1 away draw against Real Valladolid.

References

External links

1997 births
Living people
Spanish footballers
Footballers from Terrassa
Association football goalkeepers
La Liga players
Segunda División B players
Tercera División players
Atlético Levante UD players
Levante UD footballers
Catalonia international footballers